This is a list of the heritage sites in George and Mossel Bay, situated in the Western Cape, as recognized by the South African Heritage Resources Agency.

|}

References 

George and Mossel Bay
Heritage lists
Heritage lists